Degarra is a locality in the Shire of Douglas, Queensland, Australia.

Geography 
The locality is bounded to the north by the Bloomfield River.

References 

Shire of Douglas
Localities in Queensland